Arjan Stafa (born 13 June 1964) is an Albanian retired football defender who played for the Albania national team.

Club career
Stafa played for Dinamo Tirana during the 1980s alongside fellow internationals Sulejman Demollari and Agim Canaj. Following the fall of communism, Stafa was among the first players to move abroad, ending up in Italy where he played for Teramo.

International career
He made his debut for Albania in a January 1989 friendly match at home against Greece and earned a total of 3 caps, scoring no goals. His final international was the December 1990 European Championship qualification 9-0 defeat at Spain.

Honours 
Kategoria Superiore (2): 1985–86, 1989–90
Kupa e Shqipërisë (2): 1985–86, 1989–90
Superkupa së Shqipërisë (1) : 1990

References

External links

1964 births
Living people
Footballers from Tirana
Albanian footballers
Association football fullbacks
Albania international footballers
FK Dinamo Tirana players
S.S. Teramo Calcio players
Kategoria Superiore players
Albanian expatriate footballers
Expatriate footballers in Italy
Albanian expatriate sportspeople in Italy